Grassby is a surname. Notable people with the surname include:

 Al Grassby (1926–2005), Australian politician 
 Bertram Grassby (1880–1953), English silent movie actor 
 Ellnor Grassby (born 1937), Australian politician